The 2019–20 Canisius Golden Griffins men's basketball team represented Canisius College in the 2019–20 NCAA Division I men's basketball season. The Golden Griffins, led by fourth-year head coach Reggie Witherspoon, played their home games at the Koessler Athletic Center in Buffalo, New York as members of the Metro Atlantic Athletic Conference. They finished the season 12–20, 7–13 in MAAC play to finish in tenth place. They lost in the first round of the MAAC tournament to Iona.

Previous season
The Golden Griffins finished the 2018–19 season 15–17 overall, 11–7 in MAAC play to finish in a four-way tie for second place. As the No. 2 seed in the 2019 MAAC tournament, they defeated No. 7 seed Manhattan in the quarterfinals 69–65 in overtime, before falling to No. 6 seed Monmouth 59–73 in the semifinals.

Roster

Schedule and results

|-
!colspan=12 style=| Exhibition

|-
!colspan=12 style=| Regular season

|-
!colspan=12 style=| MAAC tournament
|-

|-

Source

References

Canisius Golden Griffins men's basketball seasons
Canisius Golden Griffins
Canisius Golden Griffins men's basketball
Canisius Golden Griffins men's basketball